Trymalium ledifolium, sometimes called Star Buckthorn, is a plant species in the Rhamnaceae family, found in the south-west of Western Australia. It is a shrub which grows from 0.3 to 2.5 m high, and grows on clay, gravel, loam and sand, on granite, limestone and laterite and on outcrops and dunes. Flowering from June to November, the flowers are a white-cream.

Taxonomy
This species was first described in 1837 by Eduard Fenzl.

Three varieties are recognised:

Trymalium ledifolium Fenzl var. ledifolium 
Trymalium ledifolium var. lineare
Trymalium ledifolium var. rosmarinifolium (Steud.) Benth.

Conservation status
It is deemed to be "Not threatened" under Western Australian conservation laws.

References

Endemic flora of Western Australia
Rhamnaceae
Plants described in 1837
Taxa named by Eduard Fenzl